Ferakusia is a suburb of Honiara, Solomon Islands, south of Chinatown.

References

Populated places in Guadalcanal Province
Suburbs of Honiara